Ji-hu, also spelled Ji-hoo, is a Korean unisex given name, predominantly masculine. The meaning differs based on the hanja used to write each syllable of the name. There are 46 hanja with the reading "ji" and 17 hanja with the reading "hu" on the South Korean government's official list of hanja which may be used in given names. Ji-hu was the second-most common name for newborn boys in South Korea in 2009, with 2,159 being given the name; by 2015, it had fallen to ninth place, with 1,968 being given the name.

People with this name include:
Yeon Woo-jin (born 1984), South Korean actor, former stage name Seo Ji-hoo
Kim Ji-hoo (1985–2008), South Korean actor
Han Ji-hoo, South Korean singer, former member of Supernova
Park Ji-hu (born 2003) South Korean actress

Fictional characters with this name include:
Yoon Ji-hoo, in 2009 South Korean television series Boys Over Flowers (based on Hanazawa Rui) 
Jeon Ji-hoo, in 2013 South Korean television series Incarnation of Money

See also
List of Korean given names

References

Korean unisex given names